Papo is a surname and a masculine given name and nickname. It may refer to:

Surname 
 Eliezer Papo (1785–1828), rabbi and writer in the Ottoman Empire
 Hope Papo, South African politician
 Izidor Papo (1913–1996), Austro-Hungarian surgeon, officer, military medical chief and academician
 Roza Papo (1914–1984), Yugoslav physician and general

Given name 
 Papo Colo (born 1946), Puerto Rican performance artist, painter, writer and curator
 Papo Lucca (born 1946), Puerto Rican musician

Nickname 
 Alfredo Alejandro Carrión (born 1948), Puerto Rican politician
 Petrus Compton, 21st century Saint Lucian politician
 Juan "Papo" Franceschi (c. 1946–1990), Puerto Rican sprinter
 Papo Román (born 1957), Puerto Rican musician

Masculine given names
Lists of people by nickname